Xerxes II (died 424 BC) was a Persian king who was very briefly a ruler of the Achaemenid Empire, as the son and successor of Artaxerxes I. 

After a reign of forty-five days—where he only had control over the Persian heartlands—he was assassinated in 424 BC by his half-brother Sogdianus, who in turn was murdered by Darius II six months later. He is an obscure historical figure known primarily from the writings of Ctesias. He was the only legitimate son of Artaxerxes I and Damaspia, and is known to have served as crown prince.

The last inscription mentioning Artaxerxes I being alive can be dated to 424 BC. He succeeded to the throne but two of his illegitimate brothers claimed the throne for themselves. The first was Sogdianus, Artaxerxes I's son by his concubine Alogyne of Babylon. The second was Darius II, Artaxerxes I's son by his concubine Cosmartidene of Babylon, who was married to their common half-sister Parysatis, daughter of Artaxerxes I and his concubine Andia of Babylon.

Xerxes II was only recognized as king in Persia and Sogdianus in Elam. Ochus' first inscription as Darius II can be dated to January 10, 423 BC. He was already satrap of Hyrcania and was soon recognized by Media, Babylonia and Egypt. Xerxes II only ruled forty-five days. He was murdered by Pharnacyas and Menostanes on Sogdianus' orders, while drunk. Sogdianus gained the support of his regions, but was killed a few months later. Darius II became the sole ruler of the Persian Empire and reigned until 404 BC.

References

External links
A more detailed profile of Xerxes II

5th-century BC Kings of the Achaemenid Empire
5th-century BC Pharaohs
5th-century BC Babylonian kings
Kings of the Achaemenid Empire
Pharaohs of the Achaemenid dynasty of Egypt
Twenty-seventh Dynasty of Egypt
424 BC deaths
5th-century BC murdered monarchs
Murdered Persian monarchs
Year of birth unknown
5th-century BC Iranian people
5th-century BC rulers